Cojo may refer to:

People
 
 Steven Cojocaru, fashion critic
 Cojo, Art Juggernaut, artist/writer

Organizations
 C.O.J.O. - The World Conference of Jewish Organizations